Timothy Weyman (born 18 July 1986) is an Australian former professional rugby league footballer, who played for the Cronulla-Sutherland Sharks in the NRL. He made one first-grade appearance for the Sharks in the 2009 NRL season, coming off the bench in a 56-10 loss at home to Wests Tigers.
He is also younger brother of St. George Illawarra forward, Michael Weyman.

In 2016, Tim Weyman captain-coached the Moruya Sharks to a Group 16 Rugby League premiership and the NSW Country Rugby League's Clayton Cup.

References

1986 births
Australian rugby league players
Cronulla-Sutherland Sharks players
Living people
Newtown Jets NSW Cup players
Place of birth missing (living people)
Rugby league props